Cauchy-à-la-Tour (Dutch:"Turringhem" (house of the sons of Turr)) is a commune in the Pas-de-Calais department in the Hauts-de-France region of France.

Geography

Population

Places of interest
 The church of Saint-Pierre, rebuilt after the First World War.
 The war memorial.
 Ruins of an old castle.

Notable people
 Philippe Pétain, marshal of France, was born here on the 24 April 1856.

See also
Communes of the Pas-de-Calais department

References

Cauchyalatour